Infante Álvaro, Duke of Galliera (20 April 1910 – 22 August 1997) was a Spanish Infante, 6th Duke of Galliera, and a second cousin of Infante Juan, heir to the Spanish throne from 1941.

Life and family
He was born at Coburg, Saxe-Coburg and Gotha, German Empire, as the first son of Infante Alfonso, Duke of Galliera (elder son of Infante Antonio, Duke of Galliera, and of Infanta Eulalia of Spain) and Princess Beatrice of Saxe-Coburg and Gotha (youngest daughter of Alfred, Duke of Saxe-Coburg and Gotha, and of Grand Duchess Maria Alexandrovna of Russia).

He succeeded to the title of Duke of Galliera on 14 July 1937. He died in 1997 at the age of 87, making him the last surviving child of Infante Alfonso and Princess Beatrice, as well the last surviving grandchild of Prince Alfred and Grand Duchess Maria Alexandrovna.

As his son Alonso died in 1975 at the age of 34, his grandson Alfonso inherited the Dukedom of Galliera in 1997.

Marriage and descendants

He married Carla Parodi-Delfino (born 13 December 1909 in Milan, Italy, died 27 July 2000 in Sanlúcar, Spain), sister of Donna Elena Serra, X Duchess of Cassano, both daughters of Leopoldo Girolamo Parodi-Delfino, Senator of the Kingdom of Italy, commander of the Pontifical Equestrian Order of Saint Gregory the Great and knight of the Order of the Crown of Italy, and his wife Lucie Henny (Dutch heiress), on 10 July 1937 at Rome, Italy.

They had four children:
Donna Gerarda de Orléans-Borbón y Parodi-Delfino (born 25 August 1939 in Rome, Italy), married Harry Freeman Saint (born 13 February 1941 in New York City, United States) on 26 July 1963, had two children, and divorced in 1977. She married secondly Ignacio Romero y Solís-Beaumont, 6th Marqués de Marchelina in 1990, no issue. Her children with Harry Freeman Saint are:
Carla d'Orléans-Borbón Saint (born 22 May 1967 in New York City, New York, United States), married John Stephen Lilly (born 20 March 1965 in Chicago, Illinois, United States) on 19 September 1992 in Riverdale, New York, no issue, divorced in 2001. She married secondly Nicolás de Haro y Fernández de Córdoba (born 13 October 1965 in Seville, Spain) on 23 June 2001 in Spain, and had three children:
Nicolás de Haro y Saint (born 1 January 2001 in Seville, Spain)
Sofia de Haro y Saint (born 19 May 2004 in Seville)
Mateo de Haro y Saint (born 10 May 2007 in Seville)
Marc d'Orléans-Borbón Saint (born 20 March 1969), married Dorothée Sophie Horps (born 17 February 1968 in Rennes, France) on 6 July 1991 in Murs, France, no issue, and divorced in 1995. He married secondly Amparo Barón y Fernández de Cordova (born 4 December 1968 in Seville, Spain) on 22 May 2009 in Seville, no issue. He had a son before his marriages with Terese Campogna:
Christopher Saint (born 7 August 1990)
Don Alonso de Orléans-Borbón y Parodi-Delfino (born 23 August 1941 in Rome, Italy, died 6 September 1975 in Houston, Texas, United States), married Donna Emilia Ferrara Pignatelli, dei Principi di Strongoli (born 6 April 1940 in Naples, Italy, died 22 December 1999 in Naples) on 12 January 1966 in Naples, and had two sons:
Don Alfonso de Orléans-Borbón y Ferrara-Pignatelli, 7th Duke of de Galliera (born 2 January 1968 in Santa Cruz de Tenerife, Canary Islands), married Véronique Goeders on 28 March 1994. After seven years of marriage, they divorced in 2001. They had one son:
 Don Alonso Juan de Orleans-Borbón y Goeders (born 15 July 1994 in Paris, France)
Don Alvaro de Orléans-Borbón y Ferrara-Pignatelli (born 4 October 1969 in Santa Cruz de Tenerife, Canary Islands), married Alice Acosta on 6 April 2007, and had two children:
Don Aiden de Orléans-Borbón y Acosta (born 19 June 2009)
Doña Amelia de Orléans-Borbón y Acosta (born 2017)
Donna Beatriz de Orléans-Borbón y Parodi-Delfino (born 27 April 1943 in Seville, Spain), married Tommaso dei Conti Farini (16 September 1938 in Turin, Italy - 13 January 2018 in Rome, Italy) on 25 April 1964 in Rome, Italy, and had two children:
Gerardo Alfonso dei Conti Farini (born 23 November 1967 in Bologna, Italy), married Délia Mittempergher in 2007 and had two daughters:
Luisa Farini
Alessandra Farini
Elena Gioia dei Conti Farini (born 27 October 1969 in Rome, Italy), married Joaquin de Haro y Fernández de Córdova (born 23 June 1971 in Seville, Spain) on 19 June 1999 in Sanlúcar de Barrameda, Spain, and had two children:
Claudia de Haro y Farini (born 28 December 2000 in Madrid, Spain)
Tomás de Haro y Farini (born 12 September 2003 in Madrid)
Don Álvaro Jaime de Orléans-Borbón y Parodi-Delfino (born 1 March 1947 in Rome, Italy), married Giovanna San Martino d'Agliè dei Marchesi di San Germano (niece of Queen Paola of Belgium, born 10 April 1945 in Campiglione, Italy) on 24 May 1974 in Campiglione, and divorced. He married second, Antonella Rendina (born 1969) on 28 December 2007. He has three children with his first wife and a daughter with his second wife:
Pilar de Orléans-Borbón y San Martino d'Agliè (born 27 May 1975 in Rome, Italy), married Nicholas Henderson-Stewart (born 1974) in June 2006, and has six children:
Felix Henderson-Stewart (born 2007)
Louis Henderson-Stewart (born 2008)
Daria Henderson-Stewart (born 2009 in Brussels, Belgium)
Xenia Henderson-Stewart (born 10 February 2011 in Brussels)
James Henderson-Stewart (born 2012)
Pedro Henderson-Stewart (born 2014)
Andrés de Orléans-Borbón y San Martino d'Agliè (born 7 July 1976 in Rome, Italy), married Anne-Laure van Exter on 30 January 2009 in London, England, with two children:
Ines de Orleáns-Borbón y van Exter (born 30 January 2010 in London)
Eugenia de Orleáns-Borbón y van Exter (born 7 March 2011 in London)
Alois de Orléans-Borbón y San Martino d'Agliè (born 24 March 1979 in Rome, Italy), married Guadalupe Solis Jabón (born 17 February 1978 in Ciudad Real, Spain) on 28 June 2008 in Asti, Italy, and had one son:
Alonso de Orléans y Solís (born 23 March 2010 in Madrid)
 Donna Eulalia de Orléans-Borbón y Rendina (born 2006, her godfather is King Juan Carlos I of Spain)

Coat of arms

Ancestry

Notes and sources

External links
 

|-

|-

1910 births
1997 deaths
People educated at Sandroyd School
Dukes of Galliera
House of Orléans-Galliera
House of Orléans